Dubai Silicon Oasis known as DSO is a free-trade zone established by the Dubai government in 2003, spanning an area of 7.2 square kilometers.

History 

In 2003, Sheikh Mohammed bin Rashid Al Maktoum, Vice-President and Prime Minister of the UAE, and Ruler of Dubai, officially announced the Dubai Silicon Oasis to operate under the Dubai Airport Free Zone Authority. In 2005, Dubai Silicon Oasis was appointed as an independent authority according to Decree No. 16, and that Dubai Silicon Oasis Authority (DSOA) has received its land spanning an area of 7.2 million square meters, to continue the establishment process of the DSO.

In 2006, the infrastructure of the DSO establishment was completed and recognized free zone. In the same year, began the completion of the first phase DSOA's Headquarters, the construction of the 560 Semmer Villas Project, and the completion of the road works, electricity, utilities, and telecommunications network. In 2015, DSOA established the Dubai Technology Entrepreneur Campus (Dtec), spanning a total area of approximately 60,000 square feet, then expanded the space to 108,000 square feet, thus allowing Dtec to host additional 800 startups. By the end of 2020, the DSOA became the home of more than 900 startups from 72 countries. In 2018, DSOA established Dubai's first integrated smart city project, the Dubai Digital Park (DDP). Spanning an area of 150,000 square meters and comprises 47,000 square meters of office space, 17,000 square meters of retail units, 235 smart residential apartments and more than 5,000 square meters of ready-made and plug and play offices.

Location 
Dubai Silicon Oasis is located in Nadd Hessa, near the center of Dubai at the intersection of Dubai–Al-Ain Road and Sheikh Mohammed Bin Zayed Road.

Education 
In 2008, DSOA established the Rochester Institute of Technology of Dubai in DSO, a non-profit global campus of the Rochester Institute of Technology in Rochester, New York. The university that was established as part of an agreement between DSOA and RIT-New York.
DSO is also home to 3 schools: GEMS Wellington Academy, The Indian International School - DSO and Vernus International School.

Sponsorship 
DSOA has been the jersey sponsor of Shabab Al Ahli Basket.

References 

Special economic zones
Neighbourhoods in the United Arab Emirates
Free-trade zones of the United Arab Emirates
2003 establishments in the United Arab Emirates
Geography of Dubai